Coryanthes alborosea is a species of Coryanthes (bucket orchids) found in Peru.

References

External links

alborosea
Orchids of Peru